Fauj Mein Mauj is a Bollywood comedy film directed by Murli Nagavalli, and produced by Ravi Walia. The film stars featured are Paresh Rawal Rajpal Yadav, Zakir Hussain, Sharat Saxena, Asrani, and Mallika Sherawat.

Plot 
In the year 2007, and India gets her first female defense Minister, who declares that the all-male infantry division must allow women into its ranks. Only one woman wants to enlist, Sunehri Dhanda.

Cast 
 Paresh Rawal
 Rajpal Yadav
 Zakir Hussain
 Mallika Sherawat
 Sharat Saxena
 Mukesh Rishi
 Asrani
 Lillete Dubey

Soundtrack

References

External links 
 Fauj Mein Mauj

2013 films
2010s Hindi-language films
Indian comedy films
2013 comedy films
Hindi-language comedy films